The United Shoe Machinery Corporation Clubhouse is a historic clubhouse at 134 McKay Street in Beverly, Massachusetts. The building is now known as Beverly Golf and Tennis Clubhouse. The English Revival building was designed by Boston architect Henry Bailey Alden, and built in 1910 as a gift from the senior management of the United Shoe Machinery Corporation to its local employees. The club, which originally occupied , became a significant social center in Beverly, providing a place for all manner of social and recreational activities.

The clubhouse was listed on the National Register of Historic Places in 1982.

See also
National Register of Historic Places listings in Essex County, Massachusetts

References

Clubhouses on the National Register of Historic Places in Massachusetts
Buildings and structures in Beverly, Massachusetts
National Register of Historic Places in Essex County, Massachusetts